Viktor Bubanj (3 December 1918 – 15 October 1972) was a Croatian general of the Yugoslav People's Army (JNA), who served as the Chief of the General Staff of the JNA from 5 January 1970 to his death on 15 October 1972.

References

Literature

1918 births
1972 deaths
People from Fužine, Croatia
People of the Kingdom of Yugoslavia
Chiefs of Staff of the Yugoslav People's Army
Royal Yugoslav Air Force personnel of World War II
Yugoslav Partisans members
Croatian military personnel
Generals of the Yugoslav People's Army
League of Communists of Yugoslavia politicians
Recipients of the Order of the People's Hero
Burials at Belgrade New Cemetery